The 2020 Belgian Darts Championship was the first of four PDC European Tour events on the 2020 PDC Pro Tour. The tournament took place at the Expo Hasselt, Hasselt, Belgium, from 28 February–1 March 2020. It featured a field of 48 players and £140,000 in prize money, with £25,000 going to the winner.

This was the first PDC European Tour event to take place in Belgium.

Gerwyn Price won his third European Tour title with an 8–3 win over Michael Smith in the final.

Prize money
This is how the prize money is divided, with the prize money being unchanged from the 2019 European Tour:

 Seeded players who lose in the second round and Host Nation invitees who lose in the first round do not receive this prize money on any Orders of Merit.

Qualification and format
The top 16 entrants from the PDC ProTour Order of Merit on 4 February will automatically qualify for the event and will be seeded in the second round.

The remaining 32 places will go to players from four qualifying events and to two invitees – 24 from the Tour Card Holder Qualifier (held on 14 February), two from the Associate Member Qualifier (held on 27 February), three from the Host Nation Qualifier (held on 27 February) and one from the East European Associate Member Qualifier (held on 7 February).

The two highest ranked Belgian players on the cut-off date will also qualify.

From 2020, all Tour Card holders will enter into one qualifier instead of two separate ones for the UK and Europe. For this tournament, there is no Nordic & Baltic qualifier due to the event being a late addition to the calendar. The place will be taken by an extra Host Nation qualifier.

The following players will take part in the tournament:

Top 16
  Michael van Gerwen (third round)
  Ian White (second round)
  Gerwyn Price (champion)
  Peter Wright (semi-finals)
  Krzysztof Ratajski (quarter-finals)
  Mensur Suljović (quarter-finals)
  James Wade (third round)
  Glen Durrant (second round)
  Joe Cullen (second round)
  Nathan Aspinall (quarter-finals)
  Jonny Clayton (first round)
  Rob Cross (third round)
  Jermaine Wattimena (second round)
  Jamie Hughes (third round)
  Jeffrey de Zwaan (third round)
  Michael Smith (runner-up)

Tour Card Holders Qualifier
  Andy Hamilton (second round)
  Justin Pipe (first round)
  Steve Beaton (second round)
  Darren Penhall (first round)
  Dirk van Duijvenbode (semi-finals)
  Rowby-John Rodriguez (first round)
  Damon Heta (second round)
  Kai Fan Leung (first round)
  Stephen Bunting (first round)
  Ron Meulenkamp (first round)
  Michael Barnard (first round)
  Martijn Kleermaker (third round)
  Danny Noppert (third round)
  Mike De Decker (second round)
  Callan Rydz (first round)
  Steve West (third round)
  Gabriel Clemens (second round)
  Derk Telnekes (first round)
  Ryan Searle (second round)
  Andy Boulton (first round)
  Steve Lennon (second round)
  Luke Woodhouse (first round)
  Mervyn King (quarter-finals)
  Luke Humphries (first round)

Associate Member Qualifier
  Wesley Plaisier (second round)
  Ryan Harrington (first round)

  Dimitri Van den Bergh (second round)
  Kim Huybrechts (second round)

Host Nation Qualifier
  Jeffrey Van Egdom (first round)
  Ronny Huybrechts (second round)
  Geert De Vos (first round)

East European Qualifier
  Benjamin Pratnemer (first round)

Draw

References 

2020 PDC Pro Tour
2020 PDC European Tour
2020 in Belgian sport
Sport in Hasselt
February 2020 sports events in Belgium
March 2020 sports events in Belgium